Haji Allahshükür Hummat Pashazade is the Sheikh ul-Islam and Grand Mufti of the Caucasus which includes the Republic of Azerbaijan, the Republic of Georgia, and Dagestan, Kabardino-Balkaria, Ingushetia, Chechnya, Karachay–Cherkessia, and Adygea in the Russian Federation. He is also the chairman of the Religious Council of the Caucasus.

Biography

Pashazade was born in Cil, Lankaran Rayon, Azerbaijan Soviet Socialist Republic (today the Republic of Azerbaijan) on August 26, 1949 and is of Talysh descent. He got his primary religious education in the city of Lankaran. In 1968 he went to the Uzbekistan Soviet Socialist Republic (today the independent Republic of Uzbekistan) where he entered the Mir-i-Arab Madrasah in Bukhara and later relocated to Tashkent where he finished his religious education in Tashkent State University in 1975. 

He returned to Azerbaijan in 1975 and became the acting secretary of the Caucasian Muslims Office, and Akhund and deputy chief of the Taza Pir Mosque in the Azerbaijani capital Baku. In 1980 he was elected chairman of the Caucasian Muslims Office and became Sheikh ul-Islam. After the collapse and dissolution of the Soviet Union and independence of Azerbaijan, in 1992, he was elected chairman of the Supreme Religious Board of Caucasian peoples of Azerbaijan, Georgia, Dagestan, Kabardino-Balkaria, Ingushetia, Chechnya, Karachay-Cherkessia, and Adygea.

Pashazade is a member of the Management Board of World Islamic Congress and the Management Board of Eurasia Islamic Council, among a number of other international organizations. He was elected co-chair of CIS Interreligious Council in 2004.

On November 21, 2009, he was included in a book called 500 Most Influential Muslims of World.

Honors, awards, and decorations

In 1986, he was elected a member of Royal Academy of Jordan. 

 “Lenin Order of Friendship Among the Peoples” (1988, USSR)
 “Al-elm va amal” Order (1992, Egypt)
 “Order of Glory” (1994, Egypt)
 “First Rank Order of Independence” (1999, Azerbaijan)
 “Order of St. Vladimir, First class” (2001, Russian Orthodox Church)
 “Order of the Golden Fleece” (2009, Georgia)

See also
State Committee for Work with Religious Organizations of Azerbaijan Republic
Islam in Azerbaijan

References

External links
Biography in Russian

1949 births
Living people
Azerbaijani Shia clerics
Azerbaijani Shia Muslims
Islam in Azerbaijan
Azerbaijani religious leaders
Recipients of the Istiglal Order
Recipients of the Order of the Golden Fleece (Georgia)
Azerbaijani people of Talysh descent
National University of Uzbekistan alumni
Grand Muftis of the Caucasus
Soviet muftis
Talysh people
Shaykh al-Islams of the Religious Council of the Caucasus